is a 26-episode Japanese anime television series, produced by Ajia-do Animation Works and Bandai Visual, which first aired on NHK between and Directed by Tomomi Mochizuki and written by Kazunori Itō, the series featured character designs by Sunaho Tobe, who also illustrated the series' light novel adaptation, which was serialized in Dengeki Bunko between August 10 and December 10, 2005.

Plot

Summer Arc
The first twelve episodes of the series focus on the day-to-day life of Ayumu Aizawa as he visits his father, a veterinarian, at a small town in the countryside. Ayumu has spent his visit thus far aimlessly biking across the valley, but a chance meeting with a girl named Miku sends him searching for a long-lost friend of his, Wakkun. Upon finding Wakkun, he discovers that the boy has not aged since he and Ayumu played as children. Wakkun is also wearing clothes very similar to the raincoat and galoshes that Ayumu wore habitually as a child. Wakkun introduces Ayumu to his two friends, Dosshiru (Doss) and Shisshin (Sense), mysterious flying objects that alternate between a mechanical form and a sphere of yellow light.

These lights seem to be invisible to most of the people in town, but appear in reflections in people and animals' eyes. A local reporter, Akira Sukawara, shows up, attracted by reports of kappa and other mysterious events. She follows the animals, notably a cat one of the local boys saw fighting a kappa, to the yellow lights, and grills a reluctant Ayumu for information. Unable to remember the summer he spent in Tana as a child, Ayumu, with the help of Miku and several other people from Tana, tries to understand what happened when he was a child, and the mysterious connection between him, Wakkun, Dosshiru, and Shisshin...

Winter Arc
One and a half years later, Kisa Tanigawa, a depressed high school student, routinely skips class. One evening, wandering aimlessly around the city, she stumbles upon another mysterious mechanical object. Naming it "Bun-chan" or "Ping" in the English dub, after the sound it makes, she takes it home and treats it as a pet. When she tries building a fish out of old scraps of metal, the top fin of the fish does not stay, so Bun-chan (Ping) helps glue it on. Meanwhile, Sukawara reappears, now trying to prove the existence of the mysterious objects that appeared at the Cat Dance in Tana a year and half ago, which she terms "material fairies", and hears about Bun-chan. Upon witnessing a meeting between Kisa and Ayumu, she calls Bun-chan not a material fairy, but a "material evil", as its outward appearance does not resemble those of the material fairies spotted in Tana. The material fairies and the material evils, however, seem to be at war with each other. When the three meet, Dosshiru, Shisshin and Bun-chan. Dosshiru and Shisshin start chasing Bun-chan and soon destroy it, leaving Kisa very upset that Bun-chan is gone. After a while the connection of Kisa's fish's metal fin starts glowing. One night the fish turns into a sprite form of Bun-chan. Kisa then decides to name it Po-chan.

The city's population becomes increasingly aware of the situation, as pictures of the material evils, spheres of blue light, circulate among cell-phone users, accompanied by rumors that they bring good luck. Murals appear urging people to think and trust themselves. Eventually, a giant spiral, resembling the metal construction of the material evils, appears in the sky, and the police evacuate a section of the city. Some of the same phenomena are present as in Tana, such as the failure of electronic devices.

Characters

Summer Arc

Winter Arc

References

External links
Animax East Asia website for Absolute Boy
Animax South Asia website for Absolute Boy

2005 Japanese novels
Ajia-do Animation Works
Anime series
Anime with original screenplays
Bandai Namco franchises
Bandai Visual
Dengeki Bunko
Light novels
Mystery anime and manga
NHK original programming